Gapalphedi is a village and former Village Development Committee that is now part of Kageshwari-Manohara Municipality in Kathmandu District in Province No. 3 of central Nepal. At the time of the 2011 Nepal census it had a population of 5,533 and had 1,166 households in it.

References

Populated places in Kathmandu District